Plasterfield is a hamlet in the Scottish Outer Hebrides, on the Isle of Lewis. Plasterfield is within the parish of Stornoway.

Plasterfield is a suburb of Stornoway and consists of two groups of houses, (built after World War II). The ambulance station for the Isle of Lewis is also located at Plasterfield as well a small industrial estate (Mossend estate). In the 1970s a group of Barratt houses were built adjacent to Plasterfield, this area was originally called Bayview and now has its own separate set of street names and is connected to Constable Road. Plasterfield is also the home of the MacKinnon's Bakery (now The Blackhouse bakery).

Angus Macleod, the former Scottish editor of The Times, was raised in Plasterfield.

References

External links

Geograph images from the area around Plasterfield

Villages in the Isle of Lewis